Gregory Scott Owens, commonly known by his stage name Manchild (sometimes abbreviated as MC and previously known as Soulheir the Manchild) is a Christian rapper who works within the alternative hip hop genre. He fronts the underground and Christian hip hop group Mars ILL, is part of the Deepspace5 supergroup collective, and has collaborated with the likes of Christian rappers KJ-52 and John Reuben.

Name 
Manchild describes the origin of the name Soulheir in "Manchild Speaks" (a spoken word interlude found on The Ringleader by DJ Maj): "I used to know this cat named Soulheir / But I offed him, now I use his name often / Manchild is the cat that you wanna be quotin'."

Website 
In February 2008, Manchild announced on Mars ILL's forum that he was starting up Manchildinsider.com, originally a subscription only site that featured five new songs for $5 every month, with an option to pay for the entire year for $50. In September, the blog was made public, with only the songs themselves sent privately to members who've signed up for the songs. "After starting up and running an independent label and all it entails, and after essentially being signed to a major [EMI] through Gotee, I knew it was time for a different chapter of releasing new music," Manchild told PerformerMag about why he decided to sell his music this way.

In 2009, Manchild and Sean P released a collaborative album, Move Merchants, a name they also adopted for themselves, that includes some tracks that are explicitly Catholic hip hop.

Guest appearances

Deepspace5 contributions

The Future Ain't What It Used To Be
 From The Outside (4:28)
 Spit Shine (4:16)
 Lord Willing (5:01)
 Black Magic (4:00)
 Ohgeez (4:34)
 Punch Drunk (4:38)
 Killing With Kindness (3:41)
 Beat The Rap (5:17)
 Natural Selection (4:32)
 All You Can Eat (4:13)
 Geronimo (4:44)
 Body Double (3:20)
 And It Was Good (7:00)
 Where Amazing Happens (5:45) 
Deepspace5oul (DeepspaceSoul)
Deepspace 5oul
Lip Service remix
The Founder
Double Dog Dare You
Downtown Connects
Unique Just Like Everyone Else
	Talk Music  
	Wingspan  
	Mechanical Advantage  
	Truth Be Told  
	Half Hearted   
	One and the Same   
	City Scaping   
	I Don't Make It  
	Brilliant   
	Start Right Here   
	The Last One   
	One for the Road   
	People are people - single  
The Night We Called It a Day
	The Night We Called It a Day  
	Elementary  
	Stick This in Your Ear
	Take the Rhythm  
	This Curse I Bear  
	Ziontific  
	World Go Round  
	FWords  
	Thinking By Numbers   
	If Tomorrow Starts Without Me   
DeepSpace5 EP
	Create To Devastate
	Voice of the Guns
	Hall of Justice
	Dwell in Possibility
	If I Laugh
	Universal

References

External links

 
 MARSILL.COM

African-American male rappers
Living people
Performers of Christian hip hop music
Rappers from Atlanta
Year of birth missing (living people)
Deepspace5 members
21st-century American rappers